Aasra is a 1966 Hindi movie produced by Madan Mohla and directed by Satyen Bose. The film stars Biswajeet, Mala Sinha, Balraj Sahni, Nirupa Roy and Jagdeep. The film's music is by Laxmikant-Pyarelal. The movie is loosely based on the 1961 Bengali movie Madhyarater Tara.

Plot
Amar Kumar is an eligible bachelor and his parents are looking to match him up. Amar meets Roopa but is more attracted her cousin, Shobha. The girl is treated as a house servant in Roopa's household. When Amar's feelings become public, Roopa beats Shobha. Frightened, she keeps away from Amar. The man travels abroad for several months; again Shobha is beaten. She escapes from the abusive household and is taken in by Amar's parents. There is a twist, though, she is pregnant and the identity of the father is unclear.

Cast
 Biswajeet as Amar 
 Mala Sinha as Shobha 
 Balraj Sahni as Surendranath 
 Nirupa Roy as Maya
 David as Bishambharnath
 Praveen Paul as Mrs. Bishambharnath
 Jagdeep as Harish (Bishambharnath's Eldest Son)
 Ameeta as Roopa (Bishambharnath's Eldest Daughter)

Soundtrack
Lyricist: Anand Bakshi

References

External links
 

1966 films
1960s Hindi-language films
Films scored by Laxmikant–Pyarelal
Films directed by Satyen Bose